Invicta (Latin for "unvanquished") may refer to:

Companies
 Invicta (company), an Italian outdoor equipment manufacturer
 Invicta Bus Services, a bus operator in Melbourne, Australia
 Invicta International Airlines, a UK charter airline from 1965 to 1982
 Invicta Watch Group, a Florida-based watch company
 Invicta Plastics, a British plastic business; holder of the rights to Mastermind

Places
 Porto, also known as the cidade invicta (unvanquished city)
 Invicta Park Barracks, a military installation in Maidstone, Kent
 Invicta Grammar School, academy in Maidstone, Kent, England

Music
 Invicta (Hit the Lights album), 2012
 Invicta (The Enid album), 2012
 Radio Invicta (London), a 1970s/1980s pirate radio station in London
 Radio 390 (formerly Invicta), a 1960s offshore radio station
 Invicta Radio (now Heart Kent), a licensed radio station in Kent

Transportation
 Invicta (car), a British make of car
 Buick Invicta, a car made by American manufacturer Buick from 1959 to 1963, and 2008 concept car
 Invicta (locomotive), an early steam locomotive
 , a number of ships with this name
 Invicta (sailboat), a fibreglass hulled sailboat

Related to the English county of Kent
 Invicta (motto), motto of the county of Kent, England
 White horse of Kent, also known as Invicta, the prancing horse symbol
 List of organisations in Kent named Invicta

Sports
 Invicta Ground, a former football stadium in Plumstead, England, closed ca. 1894
 Invicta Fighting Championships, an American mixed martial arts organization focused on female fighters
 Kent Invicta, a defunct rugby team
 Maidstone Invicta, founding name of Maidstone United Football Club
Folkestone Invicta, a football club based in Folkestone, Kent

See also
 
 
 Invicta Flag, alternate name for the Flag of Kent
 Cidade Invicta, alternate name for Porto, a city in Portugal
 Città Invicta, alternate name for Senglea, a city in Malta
 Solenopsis invicta, the scientific name for the red imported fire ant
 Semper Invicta, the motto of Warsaw, Poland
 Invictus (disambiguation)
 Radio Invicta (disambiguation)
 Unvanquished (disambiguation)